A by-election was held in the Legislative Assembly of Queensland seat of Rockhampton on 16 February 1985. It was triggered by the resignation of sitting Labor member Keith Wright.

The seat was retained by the Labor Party with the election of candidate Paul Braddy.

Background

Keith Wright was first elected to state parliament at the 1969 state election as the Labor member for Rockhampton South, retaining the seat at the 1972 state election when the district was renamed Rockhampton. Wright held Rockhampton continuously thereafter, becoming Leader of the Opposition on 20 October 1982. After leading his party to defeat at the 1983 state election, at which his own support in Rockhampton had slipped by 6% despite statewide gains by his party, Wright was replaced as leader on 29 August 1984 by Nev Warburton.

Wright resigned from state parliament on 5 November 1984 to contest the 1984 federal election. The following month he was elected as member for the overlapping federal seat of Capricornia.

The Nationals made a determined effort to win the seat, as it would extend their base in the provincial cities zone. The by-election coincided with a major industrial dispute within the state's power industry between the government and the trade union movement.

Timeline

Results
Normally a safe seat for the Labor Party, it was retained by new candidate Paul Braddy. The result was nonetheless a boost for new Labor leader Nev Warburton and a blow to the governing Nationals, who might have hoped that the ongoing industrial dispute between the government and the state's power industry workers would hurt the Labor Party.

See also
List of Queensland state by-elections

References

1985 elections in Australia
Queensland state by-elections
1980s in Queensland
February 1985 events in Australia